Cnemaspis rajgadensis is a species of diurnal, rock-dwelling, insectivorous gecko endemic to  India. It is distributed in Maharashtra.

References

 Cnemaspis rajgadensis

rajgadensis
Reptiles of India
Reptiles described in 2021